Longicoelotes is a genus of East Asian funnel weavers first described by X. P. Wang in 2002.

Species
 it contains four species:

Longicoelotes geei Zhang & Zhao, 2017 – China
Longicoelotes karschi Wang, 2002 – China
Longicoelotes kulianganus (Chamberlin, 1924) – China
Longicoelotes senkakuensis (Shimojana, 2000) – Japan (Ryukyu Is.)

References

External links

Agelenidae
Araneomorphae genera
Spiders of Asia